2010 Empress's Cup Final was the 32nd final of the Empress's Cup competition. The final was played at National Stadium in Tokyo on January 1, 2011. INAC Kobe Leonessa won the championship.

Overview
INAC Kobe Leonessa won their 1st title, by defeating Urawa Reds on a penalty shoot-out.

Match details

See also
2010 Empress's Cup

References

Empress's Cup
2010 in Japanese women's football
Japanese Women's Cup Final 2010